Journal of Medical Imaging and  Radiation Oncology (formerly: Australasian Radiology; print: ,) is the official journal of the Royal Australian and New Zealand College of Radiologists. It is a bimonthly medical journal covering radiological practice and research in Australasia. It is published by Wiley-Blackwell and was established in 1957.

According to the Journal Citation Reports, its 2009 impact factor is 0.602, ranking it 96th out of 104 journals in the category "Radiology, Nuclear Medicine & Medical Imaging".

External links
 
 Royal Australian and New Zealand College of Radiologists

Bimonthly journals
Radiology and medical imaging journals
Wiley-Blackwell academic journals
English-language journals
Publications established in 1957